Aleksandr Komarov  Aleksandr Komarov (wrestler) (Russian: Александр Андреевич Комаров; born 1999), Russian Greco-Roman wrestler
 Aleksandr Komarov (ice hockey) (Russian: Александр Георгиевич Комаров; 1923−2013), Soviet ice hockey player

See also 
 Oleksandr Komarov
 Komarov (surname)